Charles Duane Baker (September 17, 1846 – April 23, 1934) was an Assistant United States Attorney and a member of the New York State Assembly (1885–1887). He was the grandfather and great-grandfather of Massachusetts politicians Charles D. Baker (born 1928) and Charlie Baker (born 1956), respectively.

Life and career
Baker was born in the village of Painted Post in Steuben County, New York. His mother, Elizabeth (Fleming) Baker, was the daughter of John Fleming, an early Painted Post settler. His father, Harrison H. Baker, was a millwright who became a lumber manufacturer later in his life. Growing up, Baker attended local public schools. He spent two years at Overland College before attending Cornell University in Ithaca, New York. He graduated from Cornell with a Bachelor of Arts in 1874. He was admitted to the bar in 1876.

He was a member of the New York State Assembly (Steuben Co., 2nd D.) in 1885, 1886 and 1887. Around 1889 he was appointed as Assistant United States Attorney for the Southern District of New York. He resigned in 1895 to return to private law, but was again appointed to the office several years later and served until 1908. In 1910 he was appointed by United States Attorney General George Woodward Wickersham to be special counsel and attorney for the newly organized New York City Department of Justice.

In January 1883, he married Letitia Beattie Ronk. They had three children, Charles Duane, Jr., David Dudley Field, and Carolyn Beattie. Charles Jr. (c. 1890–1971) had another son named Charles D. Baker (born 1928), who served as a U.S. government official under Ronald Reagan and Richard Nixon administrations. His son, Charles IV (born 1956) is the current Governor of Massachusetts.

Baker died at St. Luke's Hospital in New York City at age 87. He was buried in Painted Post.

References
 Near, Irvin W. (1911). A History of Steuben County, New York, and Its People. pp. 578–580. The Lewis Publishing Company (Chicago).
 Murlin, Edgar L. (1897). The New York Red Book. pp. 504–506. James B. Lyon (Albany).

Footnotes

1846 births
1934 deaths
Republican Party members of the New York State Assembly
People from Painted Post, New York
Cornell University alumni
New York (state) lawyers